Russel Howcroft (born  1965) is an Australian businessman and media personality best known as a panellist on the ABC television program The Gruen Transfer.

Howcroft is currently host of Breakfast with Ross & Russel on 3AW

Howcroft grew up in Malvern, Victoria and attended Scotch College, Melbourne.

Career 
Howcroft is the former national CEO of advertising agency George Patterson Y&R (now known as Y&R ANZ).

In February 2013, Howcroft was appointed as Executive General Manager of Network Ten and remained in the position until February 2017 before moving to PwC just months before the network was placed into voluntary administration. Howcroft holds a Bachelor of Business (Marketing) from Monash University.

In May 2017, Howcroft was appointed Chair of the Australian Film, Television and Radio School.

Radio 
In September 2011, it was announced Howcroft would host Saturdays on the Weekend Break afternoon program on 3AW, whilst Tom Elliott filled in for Derryn Hinch on the drive program.

In June 2020, 3AW announced that Howcroft will join 3AW Breakfast from Monday 3 August, following John Burns' retirement from radio. In December 2021, 3AW Breakfast won an ACRA for Best On-Air Team AM.

Television 
Howcroft has been a regular panellist on Gruen since the program's inception in 2008 and has also been guest panellist on news-chat show The Project. He also fronted the documentary series How Australia Got Its Mojo, which aired on the ABC in 2019.

Business 
Chair of the Australian Film Television and Radio School and the co-founder of The Grid Melbourne, a festival designed to bring entrepreneurs and innovators together expected to launch in 2022. He is the Chief Creative Officer and a founding partner of Sayers Group.

Publishing 
He has written/co-written three best-selling books, with his most recent book Right Brain Workout II now being published throughout the world.

References

1965 births
Date of birth missing (living people)
Place of birth missing (living people)
Living people
20th-century Australian businesspeople
21st-century Australian businesspeople
Australian television personalities
People educated at Scotch College, Melbourne
3AW presenters
People from Malvern, Victoria
Businesspeople from Melbourne
Melbourne Football Club administrators
Monash University alumni
Australian advertising executives